Sales and use tax refers to:

 Sales tax
 Use tax